Babken Ararktsyan (born September 16, 1944) is an Armenian politician. He was the former Chairman of the Supreme Council from 1991 to 1995 and Speaker of the National Assembly from 1995 to 1998.

References

External links 
 Biography 

Moscow State University alumni
Politicians from Yerevan
Living people
1944 births
Presidents of the National Assembly (Armenia)
Members of the Karabakh Committee